Best II or Best 2 or variation, may refer to:

...Best II, 1992 compilation album by The Smiths
Best II (Akina Nakamori album), 1988 compilation album by Akina Nakamori
Best II, an album by BoA comprising songs released on Best & USA
Best II ~Perfect Love~, 2008 compilation album by Toshi
Best II 1981–1992, 1992 compilation album by Anthem
The Best II, 1994 compilation album by Willie Colón
Best 2, or A Best 2, 2007 compilation albums by Ayumi Hamasaki

See also

 
 
List of greatest hits albums
Best (disambiguation)